Filip Buchel (born 16 September 2002) is a Slovak footballer who plays for Senica as a forward. He is the twin brother of Jakub Buchel, who also plays for Senica as a midfielder.

Club career

FK Senica
Buchel made his Fortuna Liga debut for Senica against FC DAC 1904 Dunajská Streda on 16 February 2020.

References

External links
 FK Senica official club profile 
 Futbalnet profile 
 

2002 births
Living people
Slovak footballers
Association football forwards
FK Senica players
Slovak Super Liga players